Marcos Roberto Pereira dos Santos (born 29 August 1979), usually known as Marcos, is a Brazilian former football striker.

He has also played for Club Athletic Bizertin and Espérance.

External links
  
 
 

1979 births
Living people
People from Salto, São Paulo
Brazilian footballers
Brazilian expatriate footballers
Brazilian people of Italian descent
Espérance Sportive de Tunis players
BSC Young Boys players
AC Ajaccio players
RC Strasbourg Alsace players
ES Troyes AC players
Swiss Super League players
Ligue 2 players
Expatriate footballers in Switzerland
Expatriate footballers in France
Association football forwards
Footballers from São Paulo (state)